The Beatty Street Drill Hall is a Canadian Forces armoury located at 620 Beatty Street in Vancouver, British Columbia. It is the home of The British Columbia Regiment (Duke of Connaught's Own), an armoured reconnaissance reserve regiment, the oldest military unit in Vancouver, and the most senior militia in the province.

Architecture
  
The building was designed by architect T.W. Fuller and opened on 30 September 1901 by the Duke of Cornwall (later King George V). With two large castle-like turrets complete with battlements, and two tanks and a 64-pounder Gun alongside the large white structure, Beatty Street Drill Hall has long been a Vancouver landmark and is listed as a class-A heritage building. The walls are three and a half feet thick, and the building rests on huge granite blocks. Limestone from Gabriola Island was used for the parapet and it features a rusticated stone trim.

The Drill Hall includes a parade square, offices, and store rooms. It formerly contained a firing range and bowling alley. Originally, the Cambie Street Grounds, now a parking lot across the street, was also used as part of the regiment's training facilities.

Memorials
A stone cairn was dedicated to the local war dead of the First and Second World Wars and the local veterans of the Korean War and peacekeeping. Presented by the grateful Dutch Canadians of Vancouver in 1970, a copper plaque is dedicated to the memory of the B.C. Regiment who helped liberate Holland in the 1944 - 1945 campaign. A wooden Celtic cross was dedicated to the officers, NCO's and men who fell at Vimy Ridge. A plaque was erected by their fellow officers and men in honour of the men of the 28th Canadian Armoured Regiment  who died while serving in the Second World War. A plaque is dedicated to members of the 6th Regiment Duke of Connaught's Own Rifles who lost their lives in South African War of 1899 - 1902. 
 A plaque was dedicated to Lt. Colonel George McSpadden and the fallen heroes of the 11th Regiment Irish Fusiliers of Canada.

Regimental Museum of the BC Regiment 

The Regimental Museum of the BC Regiment (DCO) is housed in the Beatty Street Drill Hall, Metro Vancouver. Military displays date back to 1883, including uniforms, weapons, medals, Nazi regalia, and a large collection of photographs documenting the history and artifacts of The British Columbia Regiment (Duke of Connaught's Own) and the Beatty Street Drill Hall. The museum was established in 1982 and is open to the public Wednesdays. In addition to the BC Regiment (DCO), the 2290 British Columbia Regiment (Duke of Connaught's Own) Cadet Corps also parades at the armoury.

See also
List of armouries in Canada
List of heritage buildings in Vancouver

References

External links 

 

Armouries in Canada
Museums in Vancouver
Canadian Forces bases in British Columbia
Regimental museums in Canada
Heritage sites in British Columbia
Heritage buildings in Vancouver
Drill halls in Canada
British Columbia Regiment (Duke of Connaught's Own)